The Fearless Four (also known as Fearless 4 and Fearless Four) is an American old school hip hop group from Harlem, New York. The group is best known for its 1982 single "Rockin' It", which was based on the Kraftwerk track "The Man-Machine", and was featured in the 1983 documentary Style Wars. Originally, the Fearless Four was a two-member group called the Houserockers Crew. Later, it reappeared as a six-member group consisting of the Great Peso, Devastating Tito, Mighty Mike C, Krazy Eddie, DLB, and Master OC. 

In 1983, the group collaborated with rapper Kurtis Blow to produce the single "Problems of the World." It was the first crew to be signed to a major label, Elektra Records. The group only released one studio album, Creepin' up on Ya, which was released in 1994.   

Group member, Mighty Mike C, recently signed a book deal. The book, "Hip Hop Is Fearless" is being published by Spice Star Group, in March, 2023.   A song with the related title "Hip Hop Is Fearless" is in production to be released featuring various artists.  

The Fearless Four recently performed in Staten Island (New York City) and Mighty Mike C recently performed with Kool Moe Dee, and had a separate performance at the Harlem Week Parade with legendary Doug E. Fresh.

Discography

Albums
 Creepin' up on Ya (1994)

Singles
 "Rockin' It" (1982)
 "It's Magic" (1982)
 "Something New" (1983)
 "Problems Of The World" (1983)
 "Fearless Freestyle". (1983)
 "F4000  (1983)
 "Just Rock" / "Got To Turn Out" (1983)
 "Dedication" (1984)
 "After Tonight" (1987)
 "Creepin' up on Ya" (1994)

References

External links
 Fearless Four @ Oldschoolhiphop
 Discogs
 Youtube (Problems of the world today)
 Youtube (Rockin It)

American hip hop groups
Elektra Records artists
Mercury Records artists